Central Dir District is a district in the Malakand Division of Khyber Pakhtunkhwa province, Pakistan. It consists of five tehsils, namely Akhagram Karo, Larjum, Nehag Dara, Sahib Abad and Wari Tehsil.

The Larjum and Wari Tehsil are old tehsils while Akhagram Karo, Nehag Dara and Sahib Abad were newly created along the district.

References

Central Dir District
Districts of Khyber Pakhtunkhwa